Manahar is a village in Chandauli district in the Indian state of Uttar Pradesh.

Demographics 
The village hosts twelve homes. The literacy rate amounts to 70% in the age group of 50-70 and 90% in the age group of 30-50 and 100% in the age group of 5-30 years.

Transport 
Manahar is connected via the state highway Chandauli-Chakiya-Naugarh. NH-2 GT Road is 4.5 km from the village. Varanasi is only 30 km away from this village.

Economy 
The main economic sector of the village is agriculture. Agricultural land is very costly. Mango trees are popular and of many varieties.

Most of the people are in the armed forces there. Some people are in Rajasva Vibhag, Railway and UPPCL.

Geography 
Indira Gandhi Canal runs here. It was made by P.T. Kamalapati Tripathi, former chief minister of Uttar Pradesh. It comes in Pratappur Gramsabha. Ganga water come this village through the canal. Ganga river is 20 km away from the village on West-North side in Baluaa-Chandauli and 30 km away on the west side in Varanasi.

References 

Villages in Chandauli district